Michał Tymowski (born 21 November 1941) is a Polish historian, professor of the humanities and an academic at the University of Warsaw. He specialises in the history of Africa.

Life
He was born in Warsaw.

Works 
Les domaines des princes du Songhay. Comparaison avec la grande propriété foncière en Europe au début de l'époque féodale (1970)
Le développement et la régression chez les peuples de la boucle du Niger a l'époque précoloniale (1974)
 Samori – bohater Czarnej Afryki (1976)
 Dzieje Timbuktu (1979)
 Historia Mali (1979)
 Karabin i władza w Afryce XIX wieku: państwa i armie Samoriego i Kenedugu oraz ich analogie europejskie (1985)
 Historia Polski (1986) – razem z Jerzym Holzerem i Janem Kieniewiczem
 Sociétés sans Etat et sociétés a organisation étatique en Afrique Noire pré-coloniale (1990)
 Najkrótsza historia Polski (1993)
 Historia Afryki: do początku XIX wieku (1996) – redakcja
 Państwa Afryki przedkolonialnej (1999)
 Średniowiecze (1999)
 Człowiek i historia: podręcznik dla liceum ogólnokształcącego: kształcenie w zakresie rozszerzonym. Cz. 2, Czasy średniowiecza (2002)
 Europejczycy i Afrykanie. Wzajemne odkrycia i pierwsze kontakty (2017)

References

Bibliography 
  'Prof. Michał Tymowski' on „Ludzie nauki” portalu Nauka Polska (OPI)
  Tomasz Wituch, Bogdan Stolarczyk, Studenci Instytutu Historycznego Uniwersytetu Warszawskiego 1945-2000, Wydawnictwo Arkadiusz Wingert i Przedsięwzięcie Galicja, Kraków 2010
  Szymon Brzeziński, Krzysztof Fudalej Pracownicy naukowo-dydaktyczni Instytutu Historii Uniwersytetu Warszawskiego 1930-2010. Słownik biograficzny, wyd. Neriton, Warszawa 2012

1941 births
Living people
20th-century Polish historians
Polish male non-fiction writers
Academic staff of the University of Warsaw
Polish Africanists
University of Warsaw alumni
Recipients of the Order of Polonia Restituta